The AIFF Super Cup, simply referred as the Super Cup, officially known as the Hero Super Cup for sponsorship reasons, is an annual knockout football competition and major trophy in men's domestic football in India. Organised by the All India Football Federation (AIFF), the competition is open to the clubs that play in the Indian Super League and the I-League, the current 1st and 2nd division of Indian football league system respectively.

History
On 19 February 2018, the All India Football Federation announced the creation of the Super Cup as a replacement for the Federation Cup, India's main knockout football tournament. The qualifiers for the inaugural tournament were held between 15-16 March. The tournament proper then commenced on 31 March and concluded with the final on 20 April 2018. Bengaluru emerged as the winners of the inaugural edition of the tournament. They defeated East Bengal 4–1 in the final.

In the second edition, seven I-League clubs, namely Minerva Punjab, East Bengal, Mohun Bagan, NEROCA, Gokulam Kerala, Aizwal and Churchill Brothers withdrew from the competition citing "unfair treatment to I-League clubs by the AIFF."

From 2020 to 2022, the competition was suspended due to the COVID-19 pandemic.

Competition format
Until 2019, the competition proper was a 16-team knockout tournament. In the event of a match being drawn after the completion of 90 minutes after the group stage, extra time is played, followed by a penalty shoot-out if required.

The competition currently comprises 16 clubs in group stage proper and 21 overall. All 11 clubs in the top tier Indian Super League and winners of the I-League (2nd tier) enter the group stage directly, and clubs finishing from 2nd to 10th place in the I-League play in a qualifying round for the four remaining spots. During the group stage of the competition, clubs are divided into four groups of four, playing against each other in a single round-robin format. At the end of the group stage, the team with the most points qualify to the semifinals. The competition then culminates with the final to determine the champions who are presented with the super cup trophy and a spot in the AFC Cup.

Winners and finalists

Results by team

List of winning managers

Records and statistics

Individual records

Sponsorship and media coverage

Sponsor
The title sponsor for the Super Cup is Hero MotoCorp. Hero MotoCorp is also the title sponsor for the Indian Super League and I-League, the leagues which comprise Super Cup participants.

Media coverage 

Star Sports is the official broadcaster for the AIFF Super Cup, with all matches being broadcast on the channel and Disney+ Hotstar is the official online streaming partner of the tournament.

See also
 IFA Shield
 Durand Cup
 Indian Super League
 I-League
 I-League 2
 State football leagues in India

References

 
Super Cup
National association football cups
Recurring sporting events established in 2018
2018 establishments in India